Palatik or Palatnik is a village in the municipality of Belitsa, in Blagoevgrad Province, Bulgaria. It is located approximately 86 kilometres from Sofia. As of 2007 it had a population of 286 people.

References

Villages in Blagoevgrad Province